Frank Spencer (1911–1975) was a British film music composer.

Selected filmography
 The Jack of Diamonds (1949)
 The Adventures of PC 49 (1949)
 Celia (1949)
 Dick Barton Strikes Back (1949)
 Room to Let (1950)
 Cloudburst (1951)
 To Have and to Hold (1951)
 Two on the Tiles (1951)
 The Dark Light (1951)
 A Case for PC 49 (1951)
 The Rossiter Case (1951)
 Death of an Angel (1952)
 The Last Page (1952)
 Whispering Smith Hits London (1952)
 Laxdale Hall (1953)

References

External links

1911 births
1975 deaths
Musicians from Edinburgh
British film score composers
British male film score composers
20th-century classical musicians
20th-century British composers
20th-century British male musicians